Jerzy Janusz Kropiwnicki (born 5 July 1945 in Częstochowa) is a Polish right-wing politician, member of Law and Justice party.

He was  leader of small party Christian-National Union (Zjednoczenie Chrześcijańsko-Narodowe, ZChN). He was a president of the city of Łódź from 2002 until 2010.

In 2003 he banned "Parade of Freedom" (techno music festival) in the city (which was taking place between 1997 and 2003).

In November 2006 he was reelected for the office of president of the city of Łódź, but was ousted by referendum in January 2010, in which 96 percent of voters (turnout 22.2 percent) voted against him (parties in favour of Kropiwnicki advised their supporters to boycott the referendum in an effort to bust quorum).

References

1945 births
Living people
People from Częstochowa
Christian National Union politicians
Law and Justice politicians
Members of the Polish Sejm 1991–1993
Members of the Polish Sejm 1997–2001
Solidarity (Polish trade union) activists
Mayors of Łódź
Recipients of the Order of Polonia Restituta
Government ministers of Poland
SGH Warsaw School of Economics alumni
University of Łódź alumni